Revelry may refer to:

The revelries of Saturnalia 
The Revelry (album), by the Bullets and Octane
Revelry (Beyond Dawn album)
"Revelry" (song), by Kings of Leon
"Revelry", a song by Yachts (band)
Party